Kevin Rosier (January 6, 1962 – April 14, 2015) was an American kickboxer, boxer and mixed martial artist. He had much success as a kickboxer, winning a number of titles, but did not transition particularly well into the world of boxing and was mostly seen as a journeyman fighter. Notably, he also took part at the inaugural Ultimate Fighting Championship event in 1993 where he reached the semi-finals.

Career

Kickboxing and boxing
Rosier spent the majority of his fighting career in kickboxing where he held a record of 66 wins, all by knockout, and 8 losses. He was also the 3x WKA World Super Heavyweight Champion and ISKA North American Super Heavyweight Champion. His kickboxing career began in the 1980s and his last bout came in 1999 when he lost to Mike Labree in a fight for the vacant IKF International Kickboxing Federation Pro Full Contact Rules Super Heavyweight World Title on May 15, 1999 in Lowell, Massachusetts, USA. At 26 seconds into round 10, LaBree caught Rosier with a short left to the head and Rosier went down to his knees and the bout was stopped.

He also had a 12-year career as a professional boxer in which he held a 7–17 record. He fought between 1989 and 2001 and came up against a number of high-profile opponents including Josué Blocus, Roman Bugaj, Tye Fields, Vincent Maddalone, Joe Mesi, Nikolai Valuev, Taurus Sykes, Dan Voss Jr and Paea Wolfgramm.

Ultimate Fighting Championship
In 1993, with only five weeks notice, Rosier elicited the help of his former student World Kickboxing Champion A.J. Verel to coach and train him for UFC 1, the very first mixed martial arts event held by the Ultimate Fighting Championship. His first match in the tournament, the second in the card, pitted him against American Kenpo expert and two-time World Kickboxing Federation super heavyweight champion Zane Frazier.

Rosier opened the match knocking Frazier down with punches, knee strikes and an elbow strike to the turtled up Frazier's back, but his opponent recovered and went to exchange knee strikes with him in the clinch. At that moment, capitalizing on the lack of regulation about hair pulling and groin attacks, Frazier managed to take over by striking Rosier with a low blow and dragging him by the hair. The kenpo fighter dominated the fight with striking combinations both standing and on their knees, even breaking Rosier's jaw with a right hand. Some minutes later, however, Frazier slowed down due to exhaustion, allowing Rosier to recover and come back with several punches that put Frazier against the fence. Rosier then pushed him down to the mat and scored multiple punches and stomps to the back of the head until Frazier's corner threw the towel.

In the semifinals, Rosier came up against Dutch savate fighter Gerard Gordeau. The Dutchman targeted Rosier's knees with leg kicks and kept distance with him through jabbing. When Rosier was forced to cover down after a barrage of knees and elbows, Gordeau scored a stomp to the spleen, prompting Rosier to tap on the mat, signalling his submission. Although eliminated from the tournament, Rosier praised Gordeau and expressed the desire to return.

After this, he continued to compete in MMA and next fought at UFC 4 where he lost via submission 14 seconds into his bout with "The Ghetto Man" Joe Charles. He competed five more times in MMA, losing four and winning one, and retired with a record of two wins and six losses.

Later life
After retiring from competition, Kevin suffered several bouts of illness (including open-heart surgery and a nearly fatal fall while already in intensive care). By August 2013, Kevin was in stable health & reportedly residing in a retirement resort in Nashville.

In April 2015, Rosier died of an apparent heart attack.

Championships and awards

Kickboxing
1994 WKKC (World Karate and Kickboxing Council) World Superheavyweight Champion  
1990 WKA (World Karate Association) World Superheavyweight Champion (above the waist) 
1990 ISKA (International Sport Karate Association) North American Superheavyweight Champion 
3X WKA (World Kickboxing Association) World Superheavyweight Champion 
1989 All-Japan World Champion 
1987 United States Kung-Fu Karate National No-Rules Tournament Champion
1989 WKA (World Karate Association) World Championship Title Fight (full contact karate)

Kickboxing record

|-
|-  bgcolor="#FFBBBB"
| 1999-05-15 || Loss ||align=left| Mike Labree || Mass Destruction: The Ultimate Night of Fighting || Lowell, Massachusetts, USA || TKO (left hook) || 10 || 0:26 || 66-8
|-
! style=background:white colspan=9 |
|-
|-  bgcolor="#CCFFCC"
| 1994-00-00 || Win ||align=left| Houston Dorr || || Biloxi, Mississippi, USA || KO (right hook) || 2 || 1:25 || 
|-
! style=background:white colspan=9 |
|-
|-  bgcolor="#FFBBBB"
| 1990-01-20 || Loss ||align=left| Maurice Smith || AJKF: Inspiring Wars 1 || Tokyo, Japan || KO (left jab and right overhand) || 2 || 1:42 || 15-4
|-
! style=background:white colspan=9 |
|-
|-  bgcolor="#CCFFCC"
| 1989-05-14 || Win ||align=left| Don Nakaya Nielsen || AJKF: Knockout of the Century - Part 3 || Tokyo, Japan || TKO (referee stoppage/right uppercut) || 6 || 1:05 || 15-2
|-
! style=background:white colspan=9 |
|-
|-  bgcolor="#CCFFCC"
| 1989-04-27 || Win ||align=left| Dan Voss Jr || Coors: SUPERFIGHTS Full Contact Karate -  || Santa Clara, CA || TKO (referee stoppage) || 2 || 1:36 || 
|-
! style=background:white colspan=9 |
|-
|-
| colspan=9 | Legend:

Mixed martial arts record

|-
|Loss
|align=center|2–6
|Brad Gabriel
|TKO (punches)
|IFC: Battleground 2000
|
|align=center|1
|align=center|1:12
|Kahnawake, Quebec, Canada
|
|-
|Win
|align=center|2–5
|Joe Bramante
|Submission (rear-naked choke)
|IFC: Fighters Revenge
|
|align=center|1
|align=center|1:01
|Kahnawake, Quebec, Canada
|
|-
|Loss
|align=center|1–5
|Dan Severn
|Submission
|Cage Combat 1
|
|align=center|1
|align=center|1:00
|Conesville, Iowa, United States
|
|-
|Loss
|align=center|1–4
|Dan Severn
|TKO (knees)
|Extreme Challenge 15
|
|align=center|1
|align=center|0:53
|Muncie, Indiana, United States
|
|-
|Loss
|align=center|1-3
|Houston Dorr
|Submission (guillotine choke)
|IFC 2: Mayhem in Mississippi
|
|align=center|1
|align=center|11:10
|Biloxi, Mississippi, United States
|
|-
|Loss
|align=center|1–2
|Joe Charles
|Submission (armbar)
|UFC 4
|
|align=center|1
|align=center|0:14
|Tulsa, Oklahoma, United States
|
|-
|Loss
|align=center|1–1
|Gerard Gordeau
|TKO (corner stoppage)
|rowspan=2|UFC 1
|rowspan=2|
|align=center|1
|align=center|0:59
|rowspan=2|Denver, Colorado, United States
|
|-
|Win
|align=center|1–0
|Zane Frazier
|TKO (corner stoppage)
|align=center|1
|align=center|4:20
|

Professional boxing record

References

External links

 Kevin Rosier — retired MMA fighter and bodyguard

1962 births
2015 deaths
People from Lancaster, New York
American male kickboxers
Kickboxers from New York (state)
Heavyweight kickboxers
Heavyweight boxers
Boxers from New York (state)
American male mixed martial artists
Heavyweight mixed martial artists
Mixed martial artists utilizing boxing
Mixed martial artists utilizing karate
Mixed martial artists utilizing judo
Mixed martial artists utilizing aikido
Mixed martial artists from Florida
Mixed martial artists from New York (state)
American male boxers
Ultimate Fighting Championship male fighters